, provisional designation , is a risk-listed asteroid, classified as a near-Earth object and potentially hazardous asteroid of the Apollo group, approximately  in diameter. It once had the highest known probability of impacting Earth. In 2002, it had the highest Palermo rating with a value of 0.17 for a possible collision in 2880. Since that time, the estimated risk has been updated several times. In December 2015, the odds of an Earth impact were revised to 1 in 8,300 (0.012%) with a Palermo rating of −1.42. As of 2022, It is listed on the Sentry Risk Table with the second highest cumulative Palermo rating of −2.05 (impact risk of 1-in-34,000).  is not assigned a Torino scale rating, because the 2880 date is over 100 years in the future.

Discovery and nomenclature 

 was first discovered on 23 February 1950 by Carl A. Wirtanen at Lick Observatory. It was observed for seventeen days and then lost because this short observation arc resulted in large uncertainties in Wirtanen's orbital solution.

Observations 

It was studied by radar at the Goldstone and Arecibo observatories from March 3 to 7, 2001.

The studies showed that the asteroid has a mean diameter of 1.1 km, assuming that  is a retrograde rotator. Optical lightcurve analysis by Lenka Sarounova and Petr Pravec shows that its rotation period is  hours. Due to its short rotation period and high radar albedo,  is thought to be fairly dense (more than 3.5 g/cm3, assuming that it has no internal strength) and likely composed of nickel–iron. In August 2014, scientists from the University of Tennessee determined that  is a rubble pile rotating faster than the breakup limit for its density, implying the asteroid is held together by van der Waals forces rather than gravity.

 made a distant approach to Earth on 5 February 2021. However, at that time it was half an AU away from Earth, preventing more useful astrometrics and timing that occurs when an object is closer to Earth. The next close approach that presents a good opportunity to observe the asteroid will be on 2 March 2032, when it will be  from Earth. The following table lists next five approaches closer than 0.10 AU. By 2136 the close approach solutions are becoming notably more divergent.

Possible Earth impact 

That  has one of the best-determined asteroid orbital solutions is due to a combination of:
 an orbit moderately inclined (12 degrees) to the ecliptic plane (reducing in-plane perturbations);
 high-precision radar astrometry, which provides its distance and is complementary to the measurements of angular positions;
 a 68-year observation arc;
 an uncertainty region controlled by resonance.

At that distance and size, Diana will perturb  enough so that the change in trajectory is notable by 2880 (730 years later). In addition, over the intervening time,  rotation will cause its orbit to slightly change as a result of the Yarkovsky effect. If  continues on its present orbit, it may approach Earth on 16 March 2880, though the mean trajectory passes many millions of kilometres from Earth, so  does not have a significant chance of impacting Earth. As of the 7 December 2015 solution, the probability of an impact in 2880 is 1 in 8,300 (0.012%).

The energy released by a collision with an object the size of  would cause major effects on the climate and biosphere, which would be devastating to human civilization. The discovery of the potential impact heightened interest in asteroid deflection strategies.

See also 

Asteroid impact prediction
Earth-grazing fireball
List of asteroid close approaches to Earth

Notes

References

External links 

 MPEC 2001-A26 : 1950 DA = 2000 YK66 (K00Y66K). MPC 4 January 2001
 3D model Rotating model of the asteroid (preferred rotation model is retrograde, NeoDys)
 Asteroid Lightcurve Database (LCDB), query form (info )
 Asteroids and comets rotation curves, CdR Observatoire de Genève, Raoul Behrend
 Discovery Circumstances: Numbered Minor Planets (25001)-(30000) Minor Planet Center
 
 

029075
Discoveries by Carl A. Wirtanen
029075
029075
19500222